Polyhedron is a peer-reviewed scientific journal covering the field of inorganic chemistry. It was established in 1955 as the Journal of Inorganic and Nuclear Chemistry and is published by Elsevier.

Abstracting and indexing 
Polyhedron is abstracted and indexed in:

According to the Journal Citation Reports, the journal has a 2020 impact factor of 3.052.

References

External links 
 

Inorganic chemistry journals
Elsevier academic journals
Publications established in 1955
English-language journals